Neelam Obi (born 16 January 1993) is an Indian cricketer. He made his first-class debut for Arunachal Pradesh in the 2018–19 Ranji Trophy on 1 November 2018. He made his Twenty20 debut for Arunachal Pradesh in the 2018–19 Syed Mushtaq Ali Trophy on 21 February 2019. He made his List A debut on 5 October 2019, for Arunachal Pradesh in the 2019–20 Vijay Hazare Trophy.

References

External links
 

1993 births
Living people
Indian cricketers
Arunachal Pradesh cricketers
Place of birth missing (living people)